Cercospora penniseti is a fungal plant pathogen.

References

penniseti
Fungal plant pathogens and diseases